Selim Hedoui (born 1 October 1983) is a Tunisian handball player, playing for Al Arabi. He competed for the Tunisian national team at the 2012 Summer Olympics in London, where the Tunisian team reached the quarterfinals.

References

1983 births
Living people
Tunisian male handball players
Olympic handball players of Tunisia
Handball players at the 2012 Summer Olympics
Competitors at the 2009 Mediterranean Games
Mediterranean Games bronze medalists for Tunisia
Mediterranean Games medalists in handball
Competitors at the 2013 Mediterranean Games
21st-century Tunisian people